GADS may refer to:

 GRAP2, GRB2-related adapter protein 2 involved in leukocyte-specific protein-tyrosine kinase signaling
 Gateway Algorithms and Data Structures
 Generating Availability Data System, US power plant information 
 Gilliam Asperger's disorder scale, a diagnostic tool for Asperger Syndrome
 Goose Air Defense Sector, an inactive unit of the United States Air Force
 Gate Assignment Display System, a decision support system for managing airport ground operations